Francis Bernard, 1st Earl of Bandon (26 November 1755 – 26 November 1830) was an Irish peer and politician.

He was the only son of James Bernard and his wife Esther Smith, daughter of Percy Smith. Between 1778 and 1783, Bernard sat as Member of Parliament (MP) for Ennis. Subsequently, he represented Bandonbridge in the Irish House of Commons until 1790.

In 1793, Bernard was raised to the peerage with the title Baron Bandon, of Bandonbridge, in the County of Cork, and in 1795, he was further ennobled as Viscount Bandon, of Bandonbridge, in the County of Cork. On 29 August 1800, he was finally advanced to the dignities of Earl of Bandon and Viscount Bernard. Bernard was one of the thirty original Irish Representative Peers and sat in the House of Lords between from 1801 until his death in 1830.

On 12 February 1784, Bernard married Catherine Henrietta Boyle, only daughter of the 2nd Earl of Shannon and Catherine Ponsonby. They had five sons and four daughters. He died aged 75 at Castle Bernard and was succeeded in his titles by his eldest son James.

References

1755 births
1830 deaths
19th-century Irish people
Politicians from County Cork
Peers of Ireland created by George III
Irish MPs 1776–1783
Irish MPs 1783–1790
Members of the Irish House of Lords
Irish representative peers
Members of the Parliament of Ireland (pre-1801) for County Clare constituencies
Members of the Parliament of Ireland (pre-1801) for County Cork constituencies
Earls of Bandon